The 2022 Thai League Cup Final was the final match of the 2021–22 Thai League Cup, the 12th season in the second era of a Thailand's football tournament organised by Football Association of Thailand. It was played at the BG Stadium in Pathum Thani, Thailand on 29 May 2022, between PT Prachuap a big team from Prachuap Khiri Khan located in the Western part and Buriram United a big team from Buriram located in the Northeastern part of Thailand.

Route to the final

Note: In all results below, the score of the finalist is given first (H: home; A: away; T1: Clubs from Thai League 1; T2: Clubs from Thai League 2; T3: Clubs from Thai League 3.

Match

Details

Assistant referees:
 Pattarapong Kijsathit
 Apichit Nophuan
Fourth official:
 Noppadet Mangngam
Assistant VAR:
 Warintron Sassadee
 Kitisak Pikunngoen
Match Commissioner:
 Kraisorn Phanpean
Referee Assessor:
 Mongkol Rungklay
General Coordinator:
 Nattaphong Phukcharoen

Statistics

Winner

Prizes for winner
 A champion trophy.
 5,000,000 THB prize money.

Prizes for runners-up
 1,000,000 THB prize money.

See also
 2021–22 Thai League 1
 2021–22 Thai League 2
 2021–22 Thai League 3
 2021–22 Thai FA Cup
 2021–22 Thai League Cup
 2021 Thailand Champions Cup

References

External links
Thai League official website

2022
2